Bilingurr is a northern suburb of Broome, Western Australia within the local government area of the Shire of Broome. Its population has increased from 231 at the 2006 Census to 1,354 at the 2016 census.

Facilities
Broome North Primary School is located within the suburb.

References

External links
 Broome North Primary School

Suburbs of Broome, Western Australia